The 2010 Northern Iowa Panthers football team represented the University of Northern Iowa in the 2010 NCAA Division I FCS football season. The Panthers are a members of the Missouri Valley Football Conference, were coached by Mark Farley and played their home games in the UNI-Dome. They finished the season 7–5, 6–2 in MVFC play to claim the conference championship. They earned an automatic berth in the FCS playoffs, where they lost in the first round to Lehigh, 14–7.

Preseason
Northern Iowa was picked to finish fourth in the Missouri Valley Football Conference preseason poll. Running back Carols Anderson and tight end Schuylar Oordt were each named to the preseason all-conference team. Tight end Ryan Mahaffey and place kicker Billy Hallgren were each honorable mentions.

Schedule

Personnel

Roster
2010 Roster

Coaching staff

Rankings

References

Northern Iowa
Northern Iowa Panthers football seasons
Missouri Valley Football Conference champion seasons
Northern Iowa
Northern Iowa Panthers football